KIOW is a Full Service formatted broadcast radio station licensed to Forest City, Iowa, serving the Forest City/Mason City area.  KIOW is owned and operated by Pilot Knob Broadcasting.

References

External links
 Mix 107.3 Online
 

1978 establishments in Iowa
Full service radio stations in the United States
Radio stations established in 1978
IOW